Jean-Jacques Bertrand (June 20, 1916 – February 22, 1973) was the 21st premier of Quebec, from October 2, 1968, to May 12, 1970. He led the Union Nationale party.

Member of the legislature

Bertrand served as Member of the Legislative Assembly for the District of Missisquoi from 1948 until his death in 1973.

Member of the Cabinet

He served as Minister of Lands and Forestry from 1958 to 1960 and briefly as Minister of Youth and Social Welfare until his party, the Union Nationale lost the provincial election in 1960.

Bertrand tried to become leader of the Union Nationale in 1961, but was defeated by his colleague Daniel Johnson, Sr., the MLA for the district of Bagot.

In 1966, the Union Nationale was put back in office and Premier Daniel Johnson, Sr. appointed Bertrand to his Cabinet. Bertrand served both as Education Minister until 1967 and Minister of Justice until Johnson's sudden death from a heart attack in 1968. In addition to those assignments, Bertrand was also Johnson's Deputy Premier.

Premier of Quebec

Bertrand was chosen interim Party Leader until a leadership convention could be held and therefore became Premier of Quebec.

His victory (58% of the delegates) over colleague Jean-Guy Cardinal (41%), Minister of Education and newly elected MLA for the district of Bagot, at the Leadership Convention of 1969, caused a deep division among party insiders. While Johnson had been more accommodating towards the more nationalist elements of the party, Bertrand clearly positioned himself as a federalist. Cardinal was considered the nationalist candidate in the race. His defeat prompted a number of supporters to leave the Union Nationale and join the Parti Québécois.

The Union Nationale was also weakened by the passage of a controversial language legislation in 1969, known as Bill 63. Meant to resolve a conflict that plagued the public school board of Saint-Léonard, the bill confirmed the status quo on the language of instruction in the public schools (parents can choose English or French)  and angered Quebec nationalists. Two Union Nationale MLAs, Jérôme Proulx and Antonio Flamand crossed the floor and sat as Independents, along with Parti Québécois Leader René Lévesque and Liberal dissident Yves Michaud to protest against the new law.

The Bill 63 would be superseded by Robert Bourassa's Bill 22 in 1974 and René Lévesque's Bill 101 in 1977.

The less controversial accomplishments of the Bertrand administration include the abolition of the Legislative Council of Quebec, the provincial equivalent of the Canadian Senate. Since then, the Legislative Assembly of Quebec is known as the National Assembly of Quebec.

Leader of the Official Opposition

The Union Nationale lost the 1970 election to Robert Bourassa's Liberals. While the party managed to obtain the status of Official Opposition, it finished third in the popular vote behind the PQ. The UN never significantly recovered from that defeat and no longer exists as a political party.

A year later, Bertrand resigned as Leader of the Union Nationale. In 1971, he received an honorary doctorate from Sir George Williams University, which later became Concordia University. He died a few months before the 1973 election.

Personal life 
His son, Jean-François Bertrand, was the Member of the National Assembly for the district of Vanier from 1976 to 1985 and a Cabinet Member of René Lévesque's Parti Québécois government. Bertrand's widow Gabrielle served as Progressive Conservative Member of Parliament for the district of Brome—Missisquoi from 1984 to 1993.

See also
Politics of Quebec
List of Quebec general elections
Timeline of Quebec history

Footnotes

External links
 

1916 births
1973 deaths
Lawyers in Quebec
Justice ministers of Quebec
Premiers of Quebec
Union Nationale (Quebec) MNAs
Leaders of the Union Nationale (Quebec)
Deputy premiers of Quebec
Université de Montréal alumni
University of Ottawa alumni
People from Sainte-Agathe-des-Monts
20th-century Canadian lawyers